A pentamirror is an optical device used in the viewfinder systems of various single-lens reflex cameras instead of the pentaprism. It is used to reverse again the laterally reversed image coming from the reflex mirror.

Instead of the solid block of glass of the prism in pentaprism system, here 3 mirrors are used to perform the same task. This is cheaper and lighter, but generally produces a viewfinder image of lower quality and brightness.

This optical device is often (more precisely) referred to as roof pentamirror because of the roof-like ridge.

See also
Pentaprism
Single-lens reflex camera

Notes

External links
Understanding Viewfinders
Photo of a Canon 400d pentamirror

Mirrors
Photography equipment